Aloua Fetuutolu Tupou (died April 2005) was a Tongan military officer, diplomat and Cabinet Minister.

Tupou was the first Tongan to be appointed as the Commander (1977-2000), of the Tongan defence services (His Majesty's Armed Forces), since the Tongan military services was established under British service.

In December 1999 he was appointed High Commissioner to the United Kingdom, taking office in May 2000. From London he also served as Ambassador to Belgium, Denmark, France, Germany, Israel, Italy, Luxembourg, Netherlands,  the Russian Federation, Switzerland, the European Commission and the European Economic Community. In September 2004 he was appointed Minister of Defence in the Cabinet of Prince Ulukālala Lavaka Ata. He died in April 2005 of heart failure.

Tupou was married to fellow civil servant Viela Tupou.

References

Year of birth missing
2005 deaths
Defence Ministers of Tonga
Tongan nobles
Tongan diplomats
High Commissioners of Tonga to the United Kingdom